WLO may refer to:

 three-letter station code for Waterloo railway station (Merseyside)
 station code for Winslow (Amtrak station)
 White Label Office, a software program based on OpenOffice.org
 Windows Libraries for OS/2
 Wonderland Online, an MMORPG developed by IGG for Windows
 WLO is a Marine Coastal Radio Station in Mobile, Alabama